The 1976 Penn Quakers football team was an American football team that represented the University of Pennsylvania during the 1976 NCAA Division I football season. Penn tied for last place in the Ivy League. 

In their sixth year under head coach Harry Gamble, the Quakers compiled a 3–6 record and were outscored 159 to 90. Robert Graustein, Robert Mardula and William Petuskey were the team captain.

Penn's 2–5 conference record placed it in a four-way tie for fifth place, at the bottom of the Ivy League standings. The Quakers were outscored 121 to 55 by Ivy opponents. 

Penn played its home games at Franklin Field adjacent to the university's campus in Philadelphia, Pennsylvania.

Schedule

References

Penn
Penn Quakers football seasons
Penn Quakers football